Anatoliy Naumenko (born 6 September 1998) is a Ukrainian professional footballer who plays as a defender.

Player career

FC Chernihiv
In 2020, Naumenko started his career in FC Chernihiv of the Ukrainian Second League. On 24 October 2020, he made his debut with his new team against FC Uzhhorod for the season 2020-21. On 21 June 2021 his contract with FC Chernihiv ended.

Career statistics

Club

References

External links
 on Official website of FC Chernihiv
 Profile on Official website of Ukrainian Second League
 
 

1998 births
Living people
Footballers from Chernihiv
Ukrainian footballers
Association football defenders
FC Chernihiv players
Ukrainian Second League players